Botton may refer to:
 Botton, North Yorkshire, England
 Botton, namesake of Bottiaea

People with the name
 Alain de Botton, a writer, philosopher, and television personality, son of Gilbert de Botton
 Gilbert de Botton, an entrepreneur and investor
 Janet de Botton, a bridge player and philanthropist, second wife of Gilbert de Botton
 Miel de Botton, a Swiss art collector and philanthropist, daughter of Gilbert de Botton
 Frédéric Botton, French lyricist and composer